Dramatis Personæ is a poetry collection by Robert Browning.  It was published in 1864.

Background 
Browning wrote the collection in London, where he had returned with his son after the death of his wife, Elizabeth Barrett Browning.  It was his first publication after a nine-year hiatus.  During this time, Browning's reputation was fluctuating, and Dramatis Personae along with The Ring and the Book, which is widely considered his greatest work, were enough to begin a critical re-evaluation of the writer.

The poems 
The poems in Dramatis Personae are dramatic, with a wide range of narrators.  The narrator is usually in a situation that reveals to the reader some aspect of his personality.  Instead of speeches that are intended for others' ears, most are soliloquies.  They are generally darker than the poems found in Men and Women, his previous collection, and along with The Ring and the Book these poems embody a turning point in Browning's style.  Browning's poetry after this point most notably touches on religion and marital distress, two potent issues of his time period.

This new style was appreciated, as Dramatis Personae sold enough copies for a second edition to be published, which was a first in Browning's career.  However, though he gained respect, Browning didn't have much commercial success as a poet.  The sales of this work and most notably his Collected Poems were helped by public sympathy after the death of his wife.

Poems in the collection 
 James Lee’s Wife 
 Gold Hair: A Story of Pornic 
 The Worst of It 
 Dîs Aliter Visum 
 Too Late 
 Abt Vogler
 Rabbi ben Ezra
 A Death in the Desert 
 Caliban upon Setebos 
 Confessions 
 May and Death 
 Deaf and Dumb 
 Prospice 
 Eurydice to Orpheus 
 Youth and Art 
 A Face 
 A Likeness 
 Mr. Sludge, "The Medium"
 Apparent Failure 
 Epilogue

External links

Dramatis Personae

1864 poems
English poetry collections
Dramatis Personae